Kevin Hart: What Now? (The Mixtape Presents Chocolate Droppa) is the debut mixtape hosted by Chocolate Droppa, the musical alter ego of actor and comedian Kevin Hart. The album was released on October 14, 2016, by Motown Records. The album features many guest vocalists.

Track listing

References 

2016 albums
Motown albums
Albums produced by 1500 or Nothin'
Albums produced by Cool & Dre
Albums produced by Metro Boomin
Albums produced by Lex Luger